Morgan Maddox Morgan-Owen DSO ( – 14 August 1950) was a Welsh amateur footballer who played in the Football League for Glossop and Nottingham Forest as a wing half. He won 12 caps and scored two goals for Wales between 1897 and 1907 and had a long career with each of the tour leading amateur clubs of the period, Corinthian and Casuals.

Personal life 
Morgan-Owen's brother Hugh was also a Welsh international footballer. He was educated at Colet School, Shrewsbury School and Oriel College, Oxford and gained an honours degree in Modern History from the latter institution. After the First World War, he continued his career as a schoolteacher at Repton School (1909–1937) and also served as diplomatic private secretary. He married in 1925 and had three children.

First World War 
Morgan-Owen enlisted in the Essex Regiment in 1905 and served as a major with the regiment during the First World War, seeing action at Gallipoli, Langemarck, Cambrai and the German spring offensive. He also had two periods attached to the Rifle Brigade, the second as a temporary lieutenant colonel commanding the 10th (Service) Battalion. He was awarded the DSO in August 1918 for "conspicuous gallantry and devotion to duty. On the occasion of the enemy attack, when his battalion was in reserve, he moved it up to resist the attack and held on to the position for two days, though the troops on his flank were pressed back. His steadfast determination to hold his ground against repeated attacks and under heavy fire largely contributed to restoring and keeping in hand the critical situation which had arisen". Morgan-Owen was wounded and gassed during the war and an injury to his arm resulted in the end of his sporting career.

Career statistics

Honours 
Corinthian
 Sheriff of London Charity Shield: 1904

Casuals
 London Charity Cup: 1903–04, 1904–05
 AFA Senior Cup: 1907–08, 1912–1913

Wales
 British Home Championship: 1906–07

See also
 List of Wales international footballers (alphabetical)

References 

1877 births
Military personnel from Herefordshire
Essex Regiment soldiers
Welsh footballers
Wales international footballers
1950 deaths
Sportspeople from Hereford
Association football wing halves
Association football forwards
Oxford University A.F.C. players
Corinthian F.C. players
Nottingham Forest F.C. players
Casuals F.C. players
Glossop North End A.F.C. players
London Welsh F.C. players
Rhyl F.C. players
Oswestry Town F.C. players
English Football League players
British Army personnel of World War I
Essex Regiment officers
Rifle Brigade officers
Welsh educators
People educated at Shrewsbury School
Alumni of Oriel College, Oxford